Atlanta Millionaires Club is the third studio album by American musician Faye Webster. It was released on May 24, 2019, by Secretly Canadian.

Critical reception

The critical aggregator website Metacritic awarded Atlanta Millionaires Club a score of 81 out of 100 based on reviews by 15 critics, indicating "universal acclaim".

Anna Gaca of Pitchfork said "Few R&B albums have a pedal steel; few alt-country albums have a rap feature. Faye Webster's Atlanta Millionaires Club somehow has all of the above. Even stranger, she manages to smooth these apparent contradictions into serene folk-pop with a mellow soul tinge." Writing for Rolling Stone, Angie Martoccio noted that "The 21-year-old's Atlanta roots allow her to effortlessly coalesce R&B with indie-folk."

Accolades

Track listing

Charts

References

2019 albums
Secretly Canadian albums
Faye Webster albums